Mike Ejeagha (born August, 1932) is a Nigerian folklorist, songwriter, and musician from Enugu State, Nigeria. Ejeagha started his career in music in the mid-20th century. Also known as Gentlemen, Ejeagha has been influential in the evolution of music in the Igbo language for over 6 decades. His first hit was in 1960 - the year of Nigeria's independence.

Ejeagha is a distinct story-teller accompanied by guitar style and his lyrics are laced with proverbs; lending his music a didactic style. He writes his own music and his lyrics are in Igbo language. Ejeagha said in 2004: "Life at old age is quite enjoyable, especially when the Almighty God gives you good health".

Ejeagha has contributed over three hundred recordings to the National Archives of Nigeria produced during his field work to investigate Igbo folklore highlife music.

On the 12th of September 2022, it was reported by Pulse Nigeria that a documentary film on his life titled "Gentleman" is under production. The Film is directed by Michael Chineme Ike.

References

1932 births
Living people
20th-century Nigerian male singers